Villa Nova may refer to:

Places
 Villa Nova, Mauritania, Modern Algeria, a titular see of the Roman Catholic Church
 Villa Nova, Ohio, United States, an unincorporated community

Other uses
 Arnaldus de Villa Nova, Aragonese physician
 Villa Nova (Laurinburg, North Carolina), United States, a historic home
 Villa Nova Atlético Clube, Brazilian football club

See also
 Nova Villa, Filipino Actress
 Rainbow Bar and Grill, West Hollywood, California, United States, originally called Villa Nova Restaurant
 Vila Nova (disambiguation)
 Vilanova (disambiguation)
 Villanova (disambiguation)